Lampethusa is a genus of plant bugs in the family Miridae. There are about eight described species in Lampethusa.

Species
These eight species belong to the genus Lampethusa:
 Lampethusa anatina Distant, 1884
 Lampethusa annulata (Distant, 1883)
 Lampethusa attenuata (Distant, 1883)
 Lampethusa collaris Reuter, 1909
 Lampethusa diamantina Carvalho, 1984
 Lampethusa nicholi Knight, 1933
 Lampethusa tupinambana Carvalho, 1977
 Lampethusa viannai Carvalho, 1947

References

Further reading

External links

Miridae genera
Articles created by Qbugbot
Mirini